The IMOCA 60 Class yacht Sill-Veolia, FRA 29 was designed by Marc Lombard and launched in the 26 April 2004 after being built JMV based in Cherbourg, France.

Racing results

References 

Individual sailing vessels
2000s sailing yachts
Sailing yachts designed by Marc Lombard
Vendée Globe boats
IMOCA 60